HD 212771 is a solitary star in the southern zodiac constellation Aquarius. It has an apparent magnitude of 7.60, making  it readily visible with binoculars but not the naked eye.

HD 212771 has a stellar classification of G8 IV, indicating that it is a subgiant evolving towards the red giant branch after being an A-type main-sequence star for 1.7 billion years. It has 156% the mass of the Sun and 5 times its  radius.

Planetary system
In 2010, a group of astronomers at the Keck Observatory surveyed several subgiant stars for extrasolar planets via Doppler spectroscopy They happened to find a massive Jupiter-like planet orbiting HD 212771.

HD 212771 is named Lionrock. The name was selected in the NameExoWorlds campaign by Hong Kong, during the 100th anniversary of the IAU. It is named after the Lion Rock. The planet is name Victoriapeak, after the Victoria Peak.

References

G-type subgiants
110813
Aquarius (constellation)
212771
Durchmusterung objects
Planetary systems with one confirmed planet